Here are some notable people with the surname Jung:
 Ali Yavar Jung (1906–1976), Indian diplomat 
 Anuja Jung (born 1971), Indian air pistol sport shooter
 Anwar Jung (died 1986), Bangladeshi politician
 André Jung (born 1961), Brazilian journalist and rock drummer
 Andrea Jung (鍾彬嫻, born 1958), Chairman of the Board and Chief Executive Officer of Avon Products, Inc.
 Andreas Jung (born 1973), German politician
 Arastu Yar Jung (1858–1940), Indian surgeon
 Bahadur Yar Jung (1905–1944), argued for the separation of Muslim states in India
 Bertel Jung (1872–1946), Finnish architect and urban planner
 Brandon Jung (born 1986), Canadian water polo player
 Jung Joon Young (born February 21, 1989), South Korean singer-songwriter, composer, radio DJ, host, model, actor, television personality and professional gamer, registered with team Kongdoo
 Jung Byung Hee, member and main vocalist of the Korean boy band MBLAQ, better known as G.O
 Carl Gustav Jung (1875–1961), Swiss psychiatrist and founder of analytical psychology
 Chan Sung Jung (鄭贊成, born 1987), South Korean mixed martial artist and kickboxer
 Christian Jung (born 1977), German politician
 Cläre Jung (1892–1981), German journalist and writer 
 Jung Dae-hyun (born 1993), member of South Korean band B.A.P
 Douglas Jung (1924–2002), first ethnic Chinese Member of Parliament (MP) in the Canadian House of Commons
 Edgar Julius Jung (1894–1934), Calvinist lawyer and leader of the right-wing Conservative Revolutionary movement
 Emma Jung (1882–1955), psychoanalyst and author, wife of Carl Gustav Jung
 Jung Eunbi (Eunha): member of South Korean girl group GFriend
 Franz Jung (1889–1963), German writer
 Franz Josef Jung (born 1949), German politician (CDU)
 Franz Jung (born 1966) German Roman Catholic bishop
 George Jung (1942–2021), American cocaine smuggler, part of the Medellín Cartel
 Hans Otto Jung (1920–2009), German viticulturist, jazz musician and patron of music
 Hansol Jung, South Korean playwright and translator
 Heinrich Jung (1876–1953), German mathematician
 Helge Jung (1886–1978), Swedish General
 Jung Hoseok (stage name: J-Hope), rapper and dancer of the South Korean boyband BTS
 Jung Ho-yeon (born 1994), South Korean fashion model and actress
 Ingmar Jung (born 1978), German politician
 Jacob Jung (1857–1931), American politician and businessman
 Jung Jae-sung (born 1982), South Korean badminton player
 Jakob Jung (1895–unknown), German Nazi Party Gauleiter in the Saar
 Jessica Jung (Jung Soo-Yeon), American pop singer and businesswoman best known for being one of the lead vocalists of South Korean girl group, Girls' Generation, founder of fashion company Blanc and Eclare; sister of Krystal Jung 
 Jung Jihoon (born 1982), also known as Rain, a South Korean singer and actor
 Jung Jinwoon, member of South Korean ballad group 2AM
 Jung Jin-young (singer), leader of South Korean boy group B1A4
 Jung Jinsung a member of the South Korean boy group 1THE9
 Johann Heinrich Jung (1740–1817), German author best known by his assumed name of Heinrich Stilling
 Josh Jung (born 1998), American baseball player
 Julio Jung, Chilean television and film actor
 Jung Kiseok (born 1984), better known by his stage name Simon Dominic, a South Korean rapper
 Krystal Jung (Jung Soo-Jung), American pop singer and commercial model best known for being a member of South Korean girl group, F(x); sister of Jessica Jung
 Margarete Jung, German resistant against Naziism and East German politician
 Michael E. Jung, Professor of Chemistry, UCLA
 Jung Myung Seok, South Korea pastor of the religious group "Providence"
 Nicole Jung (Jung Yong-Joo, born 1991), American pop singer best known for being a member of South Korean girl group, Kara
 Paul Lejeune-Jung (1882–1944), German economist, politician and resistance fighter
 Rudolf Jung (1882–1945), agitator of German-Czech National Socialism and member of the German Nazi Party
 Sanam Jung, Pakistani actress, model and television host
 Samaresh Jung (born 1970), Indian air pistol sport shooter
 Jung San (born 1985), better known by his stage name San E, a South Korean rapper
 Sandro Jung (born 1976), literary scholar
 Jung Seung-hye (1965–2009), South Korean film producer
 Theo Jung (1906–1996), Austrian-American  photographer
 Towhid Jung (born 1971), Bangladeshi politician
 Jung Taek-woon (stage name: Leo), main vocalist of South Korean boyband VIXX
 Walter Jung (1895–unknown), German Nazi Party Gauleiter in the Saar
 Jung Whee-in, member of South Korean girl group Mamamoo
 Jung Yerin, member of South Korean girl group GFriend
 Jung Yunho (stage name: U-Know), leader of South Korean boyband TVXQ
 Jung Yong-hwa, leader of South Korean boyband CNBLUE
 Jung Yoonoh (stage name: Jaehyun), member of South Korean boyband NCT (NCT U; NCT 127)

See also 
 Young (disambiguation)
 "Junge", a Kara song on Die Ärzte
 Chung (Korean name), the Korean name "정"; one of the other transcriptions is "Jung"
 Zheng (surname), written as 鄭 in traditional Chinese script or as 郑 in simplified Chinese script

German-language surnames
Jewish surnames
Surnames from nicknames
fr:Jung
ja:ユング
pl:Jung
ru:Юнг